College Rhythm is a 1934 American musical comedy film directed by Norman Taurog and starring Jack Oakie, Mary Brian, and Joe Penner. The budget was $537,000. Filming started August 16, 1934.

Plot
Cocky college football star Francis Finnegan has his eye on the attractive Gloria van Dayham, as does his rival, Larry Stacey.

Francis gets a job in a department store owned by Stacey's father, where salesgirl June Cort develops an attraction to him. Finnegan proposes that Stacey's store sponsor a football team, which causes rival shop owner Whimple to do likewise. The team's head cheerleader, Mimi, falls for team mascot Joe, meanwhile, and everybody pairs off with the perfect partner after the big game.

Cast
 Jack Oakie as Finnegan
 Joe Penner as Joe
 Lanny Ross as Larry
 Helen Mack as June Cort
 Mary Brian as Gloria
 Lyda Roberti as Mimi
 Franklin Pangborn as Peabody
 Dean Jagger as Coach Robbins
 George Barbier as J. P. Stacey
 Robert McWade as Whimple

References

External links
 ; accessed September 13, 2015
 

1934 films
1934 musical comedy films
1934 romantic comedy films
American black-and-white films
American football films
American musical comedy films
American romantic comedy films
1930s English-language films
Films directed by Norman Taurog
Films set in universities and colleges
Paramount Pictures films
1930s romantic musical films
1930s American films